Charles Cahier (26 February 1807 – 26 February 1882) was a French antiquarian, born in Paris on February 26, 1807. He made his preparatory studies at the College of Saint-Acheul and entered the Society of Jesus (the Jesuits) on September 7, 1824.

For some years he taught successively in its colleges at Paris, Brig in the Swiss canton of Valais, at Turin, and at Brugelette in Belgium. The greater part of his life, however, was devoted to the collection, classification, and interpretation of the countless treasures of medieval art surviving in France, Belgium, Germany, and elsewhere in Europe. They interested him not only as relics of its artistic skill, but chiefly as pieces of evidence of its Catholic faith.

As early as 1840 he began his collaboration with his Jesuit confrére, Father Arthur Martin, an excellent draughtsman, and chief collector of the mass of artistic material that Father Cahier classified and interpreted. Their first important work was a folio on the 13th century stained glass of the cathedral of Bourges, Monographie de la cathédrale de Bourges, première partie. Vitraux du XIIIe siècle (Paris, 1841–44); the substance of it is in Migne. Their most characteristic work is found in the valuable Mélanges d'archéologie, d'histoire, et de littérature etc. (Paris, 1848–59), four quarto volumes of illustrated dissertations on gold and silver church-plate, enamelled ware, carved ivories, tapestries, bas-reliefs, and paintings belonging to the Carolingian and Romanesque periods (9th to 12th century).

This contribution to the history of medieval art was followed later by four more volumes: Nouveaux mélanges d'archéologie, d'histoire, et de littérature sur le moyen-âge etc. (Paris, 1874–77), in the first volume of which is to be found a memoir of Father Martin by his collaborator. In the meantime, Father Cahier had published a monograph in two folio volumes on the saints as grasped by the popular imagination, Caractéristiques des saints dans l'art populaire (Paris, 1867). In spite of his numerous digressions and parentheses, says Father Brucker, and a somewhat neglected style, Father Cahier is never wearisome; a vein of kindly but caustic humor runs through his pages, in which about pungent words and phrases, dictated, however, by candour and the love of truth. He was deeply versed in all kinds of curious medieval lore, and particularly in the "people's calendar" or every-day usages and customs connected with the liturgical life of the Church.  He also wrote studies on Christmas and on Epiphany in Amide la religion (Paris, 1848–1849), and in his Calendrier populaire du temps passé in Revue de l'art chrétien (Paris, 1878).

He died in Paris on February 26, 1882.

Notes

19th-century French Jesuits
1807 births
1882 deaths
French antiquarians
French male non-fiction writers
19th-century French historians
19th-century French male writers